A list of windmills in Finistère, France.

External links
French windmills website

Windmills in France
Finistere
Buildings and structures in Finistère